Janice Turner (born 8 April 1964) is a British journalist, and a columnist and feature writer for The Times.

Early life
Turner was born in Wakefield, West Yorkshire.  She went to Ridgewood School in the north of Doncaster. She attended the University of Sussex, where she spent a year as an elected Student Union Officer and edited the Unionews magazine.

Career
Before taking up her present post at The Times, Turner was a magazine editor for several women's titles, launching That's Life and Real. She left to write occasional columns for The Guardian and wrote a column about magazines for the  Press Gazette.

Accolades
Turner won Interviewer of the Year in the 2014 and 2019 British Press Awards. She was shortlisted for best columnist in 2005, 2007, and 2008, 2016 (highly commended), 2017, 2018 and 2019. She was shortlisted for best interviewer in 2006 and 2017. She was short-listed for the 2017 Orwell Prize. Turner won the 2020 Orwell Prize for Journalism. She won "Interviewer of the Year – Broadsheet" at the 2020 Press Awards. She won Comment Journalist of the Year at the 2018 British Journalism Awards.

In 2016, Turner won the award "A Woman's Voice" in the Editorial Intelligence awards which she declined with the following statement:

Writing about transgender people
Turner is known for her columns about transgender people, including "Children sacrificed to appease trans lobby", "The battle over gender has turned bloody", and "Trans rapists are a danger in women’s jails". Helen Belcher, co-founder of Trans Media Watch, condemned Turner's columns, arguing that Turner painted trans people as "dangerous sex offenders" and claimed that the Times columns such as Turner's would lead to trans teen suicides. Turner condemned Belcher's comments, calling them "ghastly" and "libelous". The Times defended Turner, writing that "Concerns of biological women must not be silenced".

In 2019, Turner tweeted that trans model and activist Munroe Bergdorf was unfit to be an ambassador for Childline because Bergdorf was a "porn model" who had posed for Playboy. Bergdorf denied ever participating in porn, and stated that it was wrong to demonize persons that do in any case. NSPCC, the owner of Childline, cut ties with Bergdorf due to the controversy.

Personal life 
Turner married Ben Preston, executive editor of The Sunday Times, a former editor of the Radio Times, and a former deputy editor of The Times, and the son of Peter Preston, in 1995. The couple have two sons. She lives in Camberwell, South London.

References

Alumni of the University of Sussex
British journalists
People from Doncaster
People from East Dulwich
The Times journalists
Living people
Preston family
British republicans
1964 births